Georgian Footballer of the Year is an annual award given to the best Georgian footballer.

The award for an official year is given in summer on the basis of players' performance in a winter league season. The winner is elected by results of a poll conducted among Georgian journalists. From 1993, it is awarded by sports daily newspaper Sarbieli (სარბიელი). Earlier, in 1990 and 1992, another newspaper, Kartuli Pekhburti (ქართული ფეხბურთი), awarded it.

References

Footballers in Georgia (country)
Association football player of the year awards by nationality
Awards established in 1990
1990 establishments in Georgia (country)
Annual events in Georgia (country)
Association football player non-biographical articles